The following is a list of the bishops and archbishops of Warsaw. On 30 June 1818, the see was elevated to the rank of an archdiocese.

Also included are the auxiliary bishops.

Bishops of Warsaw:
Józef Miaskowski, 1798–1804
, Apostolic Administrator 1806–1818

Archbishops of Warsaw:
Franciszek Malczewski, 1818–1819
Szczepan Hołowczyc, 1819–1823
Wojciech Skarszewski, 1824–1827
Jan Paweł Woronicz, 1828–1829
Stanisław Kostka Choromański, 1836–1838
Tomasz Chmielewski, 1836–1844
Antoni Melchior Fijałkowski, Apostolic Administrator 1844–1856, Archbishop 1856–1861
Antoni Białobrzeski, 1861–1862
Zygmunt Szczęsny Feliński, 1862–1883
Wincenty Teofil Popiel, 1883–1912
Aleksander Kakowski, 1913–1938
Stanisław Gall, Apostolic Administrator 1940–1942
Antoni Szlagowski, vicary 1942–1946
August Hlond, 1946–1948
Stefan Wyszyński, 1948–1981
Józef Glemp, 1981–2007
Stanisław Wielgus, 2007
Kazimierz Nycz, since 3 March 2007

Auxiliary bishops
John Baptist Albertrandi, 1798–1808
Daniel Ostrowski, 1818–1831
Mikołaj Jan Mangulewicz, 1822–1825
Franciszek Pawłowski, 1827–1829
Tomasz Chmielewski, 1837–1844
Jan Dekert, 1859–1861
Henryk Ludwik Plater, 1859–1868
Kazimierz Ruszkiewicz, 1884–1925
Stanisław Gall, 1918–1919, 1933–1940
Władysław Szcześniak, 1925–1926
Antoni Szlagowski, 1928–1956
Zygmunt Choromański, 1946–1968
Wacław Majewski, 1946–1983
Jerzy Modzelewski, 1959–1986
Bronisław Dąbrowski, 1962–1993
Władysław Miziołek, 1969–1992
Zbigniew Józef Kraszewski, 1970–1992
Kazimierz Romaniuk, 1982–1992
Marian Duś, 1986–2013
Stanisław Kędziora, 1987–1992
Józef Zawitkowski, 1990–1992
Piotr Jarecki, since 1994
Tadeusz Pikus, 1999–2014
Rafał Markowski, since 2013
Józef Górzyński, 2013–2015
Michał Janocha, since 2015

References 
 Piotr Nitecki, Biskupi Kościoła w Polsce w latach 965 - 1999, Warszawa 2000, .

 
Warsaw
Bishops and archbishops of Warsaw
Bishops
Bishops